Book of Days is the sixth studio album by the English rock band the Psychedelic Furs, released in 1989 by Columbia Records. It reached No. 74 on the UK Albums Chart and No. 138 on the US Billboard 200.

Two singles were released from the album, "Should God Forget" and "House", which peaked at No. 8 and No. 1, respectively, on the Billboard Modern Rock Tracks chart. "House" also reached No. 90 in the UK Singles Chart.

Production
The album was coproduced by David M. Allen. It marked the return of original bandmember Vince Ely.

Critical reception

The St. Petersburg Times noted that "the Furs often sound downright metallic, kicking out churning, noisome arrangements and hard-rock riffs." The Boston Globe deemed the album "dense, murky, agitated, hauntingly pretty and lush in places, generally caustic." The Toronto Star determined that the album "merits the attention of longtime fans, if only for the raw, anxious intensity that has sprung anew in Richard Butler's doom-laden voice."

The Spin Alternative Record Guide panned David M. Allen's "muddy mix," writing that "Butler's voice has never come across so biteless and small."

Track listing 
All lyrics written by Richard Butler; all music composed by the Psychedelic Furs.
 "Shine" - 4:03
 "Entertain Me" - 5:00
 "Book of Days" - 5:11
 "Should God Forget" - 4:21
 "Torch" - 4:49
 "Parade" - 4:45
 "Mother-Son" - 4:07
 "House" - 5:12
 "Wedding" - 4:19
 "I Don't Mine" - 3:15

Personnel 
The Psychedelic Furs
 Richard Butler - vocals
 Tim Butler - bass guitar
 John Ashton - guitar
 Vince Ely - drums

Additional personnel
 Anthony Thistlethwaite
 Emily Burridge
 Gena Dry
 Jem Finer
 Joe McGinty - keyboards
 John Hymas
 Knox Chandler - guitar
Technical
Roy Spong - engineer
Allan D. Martin, Richard Butler - cover design
Allan D. Martin, Peter Robathan - photography

Charts

References 

The Psychedelic Furs albums
1989 albums
Columbia Records albums
Albums produced by David M. Allen